Juan Carlos Ocampo (born 22 February 1955) is a Uruguayan footballer. He played in six matches for the Uruguay national football team from 1975 to 1979. He was also part of Uruguay's squad for the 1975 Copa América tournament.

References

External links
 

1955 births
Living people
Uruguayan footballers
Uruguay international footballers
Place of birth missing (living people)
Association football forwards
Club Nacional de Football players
Recreativo de Huelva players
Uruguayan expatriate footballers
Expatriate footballers in Spain